Eye tattooing may refer to:

 Corneal tattooing
 Scleral tattooing
 Eyelid tattooing (face tattooing)

Tattooing by body part